The Battle of Fehrbellin was a battle at Fehrbellin of the Seven Years' War between Swedish and Prussian forces, fought on 28 September 1758.

The Prussian forces under General Carl Heinrich von Wedel were attempting to stop the Swedish offensive into Brandenburg. The Swedish forces held the town, with one gun at each of the three gates.

The Prussians arrived first and managed to break through at the western (Mühlenthor) gate, driving the outnumbered Swedes in disarray through the streets. However, reinforcements arrived, and the Prussians, who had failed to burn the bridge, were forced to retreat.

The Swedes lost 23 officers and 322 privates in the battle. Prussian casualties were significant; the Prussians reportedly took with them 15 wagons loaded with dead and wounded soldiers when they retreated.

References 

1758 in Prussia
1758 in Sweden
Conflicts in 1758
Battles of the Seven Years' War
Battles involving Sweden
Battles involving Prussia
Battles in Brandenburg